The 10th Trampoline World Championships were held in Newcastle, Australia, on 5–7 October 1978.

Results

Men

Trampoline

Trampoline Synchro

Double Mini Trampoline

Tumbling

Women

Trampoline

Trampoline Synchro

Double Mini Trampoline

Tumbling

References
 Trampoline UK

Trampoline World Championships
Trampoline Gymnastics World Championships
1978 in Australian sport
International gymnastics competitions hosted by Australia
October 1978 sports events in Australia